Taylor is an unincorporated community in Harford County, Maryland, United States. Ladew Topiary Gardens and House was listed on the National Register of Historic Places in 1976.

References

Unincorporated communities in Harford County, Maryland
Unincorporated communities in Maryland